The Kenya National Examinations Council (KNEC) is the national body responsible for overseeing national examinations in Kenya. Its current chairman is Professor John Onsati. This council was established under the Kenya National Examinations Council Act Cap 225A of the Laws of Kenya, in 1980. In 2012 this act was repealed in 2012 and replaced with KNEC Act No.29 of 2012.

The KNEC was established to conduct school, post school and other examinations after the dissolution of East African Examinations Council and the Ministry of Education [EAEC and ME]. After the dissolution of EAEC and the ME the Kenya National Examinations Council took the roles of ensuring validity and reliability of examinations; and to ensure conformity to Kenya's goals and changes in government policy relating to the curriculum and examinations.

Functions
The functions of the Kenya National Examinations Council are as follows:
 Set and maintain examination standards, conduct public academic, technical and other national examinations within Kenya at basic and tertiary levels;
 Award certificates or diplomas to candidates in such examinations; such certificates or diplomas shall not be withheld from the candidate by any person or institution;
 Confirm authenticity of certificates or diplomas issued by  the Council upon request by the government, public institutions, learning institutions, employers and other interested parties;
 Issue replacement certificates or diplomas to candidates or diplomas to candidates in such examinations upon acceptable proof of loss of the original;
 Undertake research on educational assessment;
 Advise any public institution on the development and use of any system of assessment when requested to do so, and in accordance with such terms and conditions as shall be mutually agreed between the Council and the public institution;
 Promote the international recognition of qualifications conferred by the Council;
 Advise the Government on any policy decision that is relevant to, or has implications on, the functions of the Council or the administration of examinations in Kenya;
 Do anything incidental or conductive to the performance of any of the preceding functions.

Core functions
The core functions of the examination body are:
 To develop national examination tests
 To register candidates the such examination tests
 Conduct the examinations and process the results
 Award certificates to successful candidates
 Conduct examinations on behalf of foreign examination bodies upon request and agreement.
 Conduct assessment research on education
 Carry out equation of certificates and diplomas issued by other credible examination bodies
 Issue replacement certificates and diplomas upon presentation of credible evidence of loss or damage of the original.

Examinations
Some of the exams delivered by KNEC are:
 The Kenya Certificate of Primary Education (KCPE) examination – This is the exam which is done after one completes his primary (elementary) education. This is when one is in standard eight. After completing the exam, one can proceed to secondary school.
 The Kenya Certificate of Secondary Education (KCSE) examination – This is the exam which is done after one completes four years of study in secondary (high) school. After completing the exam, one is able to go to university or college depending on the grade he/she acquired.
 Certificate and Diploma teacher training examinations
 Final exams for all national polytechnics.

==References==

External links 
 Kenya National Examination Council
 Kenya National Examination Council News
 Information about Kenyan education. KCSE revision material and other related topics with video explanations

Standardized tests
Education in Kenya
Government agencies of Kenya